In basketball, an uncontested shot is any kind of shot in which the shooter has no one contesting or interfering with the shot. It encompasses shots from a layup, a slam dunk, and jump shots.  In competitive leagues, an uncontested shot is one in which a defender is not within five feet of the shooter or one in which a defender is not near enough to alter the offensive player's shot in any way. The primary strategy of most offensive plays is to gain an uncontested shot and defensively to prevent one.

Basketball terminology